Mwami is a settlement in the province of Mashonaland West, Zimbabwe.

Location

The geographical coordinates of Mwami, Zimbabwe are:16°40'10.0"S, 29°46'30.0"E (Latitude:-16.669444, Longitude:29.775000).

Overview
Mwami, Zimbabwe was formerly known as Miami and was renamed in the early 1980s.

Minerals
The area around Mwami, Zimbabwe is known to contain modalite, topaz, quarts and andalusite. Large crystals of euclase and other minerals have been mined from the area.

Health
The community is served by Mwami Hospital, a public health facility.

See also
List of cities and towns in Zimbabwe

References

External links
 Euclase from Lost Hope Mine, Mwami, Zimbabwe

Hurungwe District
Populated places in Mashonaland West Province